Agarak is a village in the Ashtarak Municipality of the Aragatsotn Province of Armenia. It is located on Amberd River. The modern settlement was founded mainly by emigrants from Van, Gavash and Bitlis.

In 1897 the population of Agarak was 603, which by 1979 had reached 1150.

Archaeology
The archaeological site of Agarak is located south of the highway on the west side of the Amberd Canyon. A dirt road leads from the village sign to the south on the mound.

The site contains some of the oldest large man-made structures carved into stone, dating to the Early Bronze Age ('Agarak 1' dated 3400 BC). This is the earliest in the Caucasus. Rock wells, rock-cut stairways, corridors, and horseshoe-shaped structures are found.

The Early Bronze Age culture area covers 200 hectares, of which 118 hectares were declared a protected zone.

In the early Bronze Age, here already existed a town with a regular street plan.

A possible ancient astronomical observatory is found here.

The Early Bronze Age site is surrounded by walls; they are up to one meter thick and were made of sun-dried mud-brick.

A large quantity of potsherds, as well as many round portable clay fireplaces, represent the Kura-Araxes culture; they are dated to 29th-27th century BC, and are similar to Shengavit type pottery.

The findings show a continuous settlement up to the end of the early Iron Age (9th century), and then to the fall of the Urartian Empire in the 6th century BC.

In 4th century BC, Agarak became an urban center due to its location on the Aras Valley trade route. This is demonstrated by the discovery in burials of coins, as well as of signet rings from the Hellenistic and Roman periods.

Based on some potsherd finds, Agarak was a village-level settlement in the early Middle Ages. There was also some sparse occupation during the 17th-18th centuries.

There are ruins of an Astvatsatsin church of the 5-6th century and it's added on *gavit* of the 10-13th century, ruins of a 10th century church of Amenaprkich (also known as Tukh Manuk) and the ruins of a 17th century mosque.

Notes

References

Report of the results of the 2001 Armenian Census
Kiesling, Rediscovering Armenia, p. 16, available online at the US embassy to Armenia's website

Populated places in Aragatsotn Province
Kura-Araxes culture
Archaeological sites in Armenia